Axel Erik  Högel (23 March 1884 – 20 September 1970) was a Swedish stage and film actor.  He was a prolific character actor in the theatre and in Swedish cinema.

Selected filmography

 Johan Ulfstjerna (1923)
 Ingmar's Inheritance (1925)
 Kanske en gentleman (1935)
 Witches' Night (1937)
 Dollar (1938)
 Comrades in Uniform (1938)
 Life Begins Today (1939)
 The Two of Us (1939)
 Her Little Majesty (1939)
 The Three of Us (1940)
 If I Could Marry the Minister (1941)
 The Ghost Reporter (1941)
 Ride Tonight! (1942)
 The Case of Ingegerd Bremssen (1942)
 Little Napoleon (1943)
 The Brothers' Woman (1943)
 The Emperor of Portugallia (1944)
 I Am Fire and Air (1944)
 Turn of the Century (1944)
 Barnen från Frostmofjället (1945)
 Maria of Kvarngarden (1945)
 Black Roses (1945)
 Desire (1946)
 The Bells of the Old Town (1946)
 Rail Workers (1947)
 Life in the Finnish Woods (1947)
 Lars Hård (1948)
 Each Heart Has Its Own Story (1948)
 Sven Tusan (1949)
 Son of the Sea (1949)
 Big Lasse of Delsbo (1949)
 When Love Came to the Village (1950)
 Teacher's First Born (1950)
 My Sister and I (1950)
 One Summer of Happiness (1951)
 U-Boat 39 (1952)
 The Green Lift (1952)
 The Clang of the Pick (1952)
 Love (1952)
 For the Sake of My Intemperate Youth (1952)
 No Man's Woman (1953)
 Dance on Roses (1954)
 Our Father and the Gypsy (1954)
 Simon the Sinner (1954)
 Sir Arne's Treasure (1954)
 Storm over Tjurö (1954)
 Darling of Mine (1955)
 A Doll's House (1956)
 Night Child (1956)
 The Great Amateur (1958)
 We at Väddö (1958)

References

Bibliography
 Kwiatkowski, Aleksander.  Swedish Film Classics: A Pictorial Survey of 25 Films from 1913 to 1957. Courier Dover Publications, 1983.
 Steene, Birgitta. Ingmar Bergman: A Reference Guide. Amsterdam University Press, 2005.

External links

1884 births
1970 deaths
Swedish male film actors
Swedish male stage actors
People from Stockholm